Píla may refer to:

 Píla, Pezinok District, Slovakia
 Píla, Lučenec District, Slovakia
 Píla, Žarnovica District, Slovakia

See also
 Pila (disambiguation)